This is a list of area codes in the state of Ohio with establishment dates.

Background
When the first area code plan was introduced in 1947, the state was given area codes 216, 419, 513, and 614. In 1996, 330 and 937 were added as splits. In 1997, 440 and 740 were added as splits. In 2000, 234, and in 2002, 567 were added as overlays. In 2015, area code 740 was overlaid with 220, relieving its rapid depletion. In 2016, area code 614 was overlaid with 380 in the Columbus/Central Ohio area for the same reason. In 2020, 326 was added as an all services overlay for 937. Area code 283 will be added as an overlay for 513 on April 28, 2023.

References

External links

NANPA Planned NPAs Not Yet in Service

 
Ohio
Area codes